The 2018 AON Open Challenger was a professional tennis tournament played on clay courts. It was the sixteenth edition of the tournament which was part of the 2018 ATP Challenger Tour. It took place in Genoa, Italy between 4 and 9 September 2018.

Singles main-draw entrants

Seeds

 1 Rankings are as of 27 August 2018.

Other entrants
The following players received wildcards into the singles main draw:
  Filippo Baldi
  Andrea Basso
  Dustin Brown
  Giovanni Fonio

The following player received entry into the singles main draw as an alternate:
  Lukáš Rosol

The following players received entry from the qualifying draw:
  Alen Avidzba
  Sumit Nagal
  Andrea Pellegrino
  Zsombor Piros

The following players received entry as lucky losers:
  Thomaz Bellucci
  Juan Pablo Varillas

Champions

Singles

  Lorenzo Sonego def.  Dustin Brown 6–2, 6–1.

Doubles

  Kevin Krawietz /  Andreas Mies def.  Martin Kližan /  Filip Polášek 6–2, 3–6, [10–2].

References

AON Open Challenger
2018
2018 in Italian tennis